Gaube Lake (in French: Lac de Gaube) is a lake in the French Pyrenees, in the department of the Hautes-Pyrénées, near the town of Cauterets.

Name 

The lake's name is tautological, in that gaube in the Gascon language means "lake", hence the place name is "Lake Lake".

Topography 

The lake is situated in an altitude of 1725 m, an egg-shaped form stretching itself along a north–south axis in the valley of Gaube. This steep-sided valley is located at the foot of the Vignemale (3298M).  The lake is surrounded by the peak Mayouret (2688 m) to the east, the big Peak of the Paloumères (2720 m) to the southeast, and the peak of Gaube (2377 m) to the northwest.

Hydrography 

Its principal inflows are the Gaube River tributaries (Gave des oulettes de Gaube), which take their name from the Gave de Gaube, which is the principal outflow of the lake.  The lake has an average depth of 40m, surface area of 19 hectares, and more than 2 km of shoreline. A delta situated at the mouth of the principal outflow of the lake is loaded with glacial alluvial deposits.

Geology 

The shoreline and surrounding slopes are covered with various glacial rock formations.

Access 

The lake is accessible by an hour's hike through the forest, or by cable car from the Pont d'Espagne in the valley of Cauterets. It is famous for its panorama and relative ease of access. It is the departure point for many pedestrian hikes; its left shore is lined by the GR 10 leading towards the Gaube River tributaries.

References

External links 

Travel site with some details regarding Gaube Lake

Lakes of Hautes-Pyrénées
Glacial lakes of France